Hunan Broadcasting System (HBS) formerly known as Golden Eagle Broadcasting System (GBS), is China's second biggest state-owned television network after China Central Television (CCTV). The television network is owned by the Hunan provincial government. The network is based in Changsha in Hunan and Xining in Qinghai. On 20 May 2009, the television network expanded its service to Hong Kong and North America.

History
Hunan Broadcasting System first aired on 29 September 1970 as a local television station in Changsha, Hunan province, China. It expanded its network through nationwide satellite television on 1 January 1997.

Hunan Broadcasting System's nationwide channel Hunan Television created Happy Camp, one of China's first variety shows. Happy Camp remained as China's highest-rated TV show, until its ratings were overtaken in 2008 by Jiangsu TV's If You Are the One. Hunan TV was also known for launching national singing contests Super Girl and Super Boy fashioned after the British series Pop Idol. Hunan TV also aired many highly rated dramas including Palace and Scarlet Heart.

Hunan Broadcasting System took a 49% stake in Qinghai TV in 2009, increasing the number of satellite channels in its roster.

Hunan TV is currently China's second most-watched channel, second only to CCTV-1, owned by China Central Television.

In 2017, the Hunan provincial committee of the Chinese Communist Party criticized Hunan TV as a "platform for gay entertainment" and for having "failed to fulfill the mission of being a mouthpiece of the Party."

Assets

TV channels

Online TV:
 Mango Television
 Qinghai Television (Qinghai TV, national broadcast, 49% owned by HBS)
 Happigo (Pay digital channel)
 Happy Fishing (Pay digital channel)
 Channel Tea (Pay digital channel)
 Table Tennis & Badminton Channel (Pay digital channel)

Radio Frequencies (Provincial broadcasts only):
 Hunan News Radio (on MW 738, on FM 102.8, 93.0, 88.0, 93.7 etc., on SW 4990) (Frequencies on FM may vary in different cities)
 Hunan Economic Radio (on MW 900, on FM 90.1, 91.0, 95.7, 94.6 etc.) (Frequencies on FM may vary in different cities)
 Hunan Fine Arts Radio (on FM 97.5, 87,5, 90.8, 95.7) (Frequencies on FM may vary in different cities)
 Hunan Traffic Radio (on FM 91.8, 100.3, 102.6,102.0,89.5) (Frequencies on FM may vary in different cities)
 Hunan Travel Radio (on FM 106.9, 90.6) 
 Green 938 (on FM 93.8, 100.7)
 Super 893 (on FM 89.3, 89.8, 102.1)
 Golden Eagle 955 (on FM 95.5, 100.5, 91.3)

Other assets:
 Mango Excellent Media
 Hunantv.com Corporation
 EE-Media
 Happigo Co., Ltd.
 Jin Yin Bao
 Mango Pictorial
 Xiaoxiang Films
 Mango Films
 Shineshow Media
 Genstone International

Production
Hunan Broadcasting System has broadcast notable programming such as Super Girl, often referred to as the Chinese version of the United Kingdom's Pop Idol. , it is airing the Chinese version of Strictly Come Dancing, a co-production with TVB.

Hunan TV
 Happy Camp
 Day Day Up
 Super Girl
 Super Boy
 Strictly Come Dancing - Chinese version (co-production with TVB)
 Meteor Shower
 Bai Ke Quan Shuo
 Wo Men Yue Hui Ba
 Gelivable Sunday

Qinghai TV
 Blossoming Flowers

References

External links

 
Television networks in China
Television channels and stations established in 1997
Mass media in Xining
Mass media in Changsha
Radio stations in China